Lytta navajo is a species of blister beetle in the family Meloidae. It is found in North America.

References

Further reading

 
 
 
 
 
 

Meloidae
Beetles described in 1951